George Frederick Senner Jr. (November 24, 1921 – October 6, 2007) was an American Democratic politician from Arizona.

Biography
Senner was born in Miami, Arizona. He graduated from Miami High School, where he played football and was president of his senior class. Beginning in May 1942, he served with the United States Marine Corps for 27 months in the South Pacific. He was discharged in October 1945 with the rank of sergeant, after which he resumed his education. In 1952 he earned his law degree from the University of Arizona and was admitted to the bar in October of that year.

Returning to Miami, Senner served as an assistant attorney for the city from 1952 to 1954. In 1954, he won election as county attorney for Gila County and served in that office until 1957. In August 1957, he became a member of the Arizona Corporation Commission, and served as its chairman from 1958 until 1961. He was elected as a Democrat to the United States House of Representatives from Arizona in 1962, representing the newly created 3rd congressional district. Senner voted for many key laws while in Congress, such as the Civil Rights Act of 1964, the Social Security Amendments of 1965, which introduced Medicare (United States) and Medicaid, and the Voting Rights Act of 1965. Though he was re-elected in 1964, he was defeated for re-election in 1966 by Republican Sam Steiger.

Upon his defeat, Senner returned to the practice of law. He died on October 6, 2007, in Sun City, Arizona.

See also

 List of members of the House Un-American Activities Committee

References
 Retrieved on 2009-02-18
 George F. Senner Jr. dies; former congressman – Obituary

1921 births
2007 deaths
People from Miami, Arizona
Lutherans from Arizona
Democratic Party members of the United States House of Representatives from Arizona
20th-century American politicians
20th-century Lutherans
University of Arizona alumni
United States Marine Corps non-commissioned officers
United States Marine Corps personnel of World War II